Mason James Stajduhar (born December 2, 1997) is an American soccer player who plays as a goalkeeper for MLS team Orlando City.

Career

Orlando City 
On November 9, 2015, Orlando City announced the signing of Stajduhar to a Homegrown contract. He became the club's fourth homegrown player. Prior to his signing, Stajduhar had been part of the club's U.S. Soccer Development Academy Program and was named to the under-18 USSDA East Conference Best XI.

Stajduhar was loaned to USL side Louisville City on April 30, 2016, but didn't make an appearance for the club.

Stajduhar was loaned out again on March 15, 2019, to USL Championship side Tulsa Roughnecks for their 2019 season. He made his professional debut on March 29 in a 2–1 win over RGV Toros. He was briefly recalled by Orlando City on June 24 owing to Greg Ranjitsingh's participation in the 2019 CONCACAF Gold Cup and an injury to Adam Grinwis before returning to Tulsa in July. In July 2019, Stajduhar was selected to take part in the MLS Homegrown Game. Having had his original contract option declined at the end of the season, Stajduhar renegotiated a new one-year deal with Orlando ahead of the 2020 season.

On December 14, 2020, it was announced Stajduhar had signed for New York City FC on loan as an emergency backup goalkeeper with the team competing in the final stages of the 2020 CONCACAF Champions League being held at Orlando's Exploria Stadium. Regular starter Sean Johnson was not permitted to travel after being ruled a close contact with someone who tested positive for COVID-19 while backup Brad Stuver left the club with his contract expiring that month. Stajduhar was an unused substitute behind usual third-string goalkeeper Luis Barraza as New York City lost 4–0 to Tigres UANL.

On July 30, 2021, 2,090 days after signing his first senior contract with the club, Stajduhar made his Orlando City debut, starting in an MLS game against Atlanta United. He was credited with one save during the game but notably conceded a goal to Josef Martínez in the opening 47 seconds and a long-range golazo from Marcelino Moreno during Orlando's come from behind 3–2 victory.

International 
Stajduhar has represented the United States at under-18 and under-20 level. In 2015, Stajduhar joined the U20 squad for an international tournament in Germany.

Personal life 
On November 18, 2017, it was announced that Stajduhar had been diagnosed with Localized Ewing's sarcoma, a form of bone cancer, and had begun to undergo chemotherapy. Team doctors found a cancerous lesion during a routine exam. Having continued to train throughout his treatment, Stajduhar completed his chemotherapy and returned to playing in full with Orlando City on June 20, 2018.

Career statistics

Club

Honors
Orlando City
U.S. Open Cup: 2022

References

External links
 
 

1997 births
Living people
Association football goalkeepers
Orlando City SC players
Louisville City FC players
Orlando City B players
FC Tulsa players
Soccer players from Connecticut
American soccer players
USL Championship players
Homegrown Players (MLS)
USL League One players
New York City FC players
Major League Soccer players
MLS Next Pro players